Nurgal District is in the western part of Kunar Province in Afghanistan,  west of the town of Asadabad, near the city of Jalalabad. It borders Nangarhar Province to the west and south, Chapa Dara district to the north and Chawkay and Khas Kunar districts to the east.

The population of Nurgal district is approximately 28,000 (2006). In 2002, it was 100% Pashtun. The district center is the village of Nurgal, located in the southern part of Nurgal district in the valley of the Kunar river. Approximately 70% of the houses were destroyed during the 1980s Soviet–Afghan War. The area is mountainous and the irrigated land is not enough. Many residents look for work abroad. The health care and the education need improvement. The most famous elders of nurgal district are Haji Abdul Rahim, Malak Wahab jan, and Malak Omar.

See also
 Districts of Afghanistan

References

External links

 AIMS District Map

Districts of Kunar Province